Claudio Procesi (born 31 March 1941 in Rome) is an Italian mathematician, known for works in algebra and representation theory.

Career 
Procesi studied at the Sapienza University of Rome, where he received his degree (Laurea) in 1963. In 1966 he graduated from the University of Chicago advised by Israel Herstein, with a thesis titled "On rings with polynomial identities". From 1966 he was assistant professor at the University of Rome, 1970
associate professor at the University of Lecce, and 1971 at the University of Pisa. From 1973 he was full professor in Pisa and in 1975 ordinary
Professor at the Sapienza University of Rome. He was a visiting scientist at Columbia University (1969–1970), the University of California, Los Angeles (1973/74), at the Instituto Nacional de Matemática Pura e Aplicada, at the Massachusetts Institute of Technology (1991), at the 
University of Grenoble, at Brandeis University (1981/2), at the University of Texas at Austin (1984), the Institute for Advanced Study (1994), the Mathematical Sciences Research Institute (1992, etc.), at the International Centre for Theoretical Physics in Trieste, and at the École Normale Supérieure.

Procesi studies noncommutative algebra, algebraic groups, invariant theory, enumerative geometry, infinite dimensional algebras and quantum groups, polytopes, braid groups, cyclic homology, geometry of orbits of compact groups,
arrangements of subspaces and tori.

Procesi proved that
the polynomial invariants of  matrices over a field  all come from the Hamilton-Cayley theorem, which says that a square matrix satisfies its own characteristic polynomial.

In 1981 he was awarded the Medal of the Accademia dei Lincei, of which he is a member since 1987. In 1986 he received the Feltrinelli Prize in mathematics. In 1978 he was an invited speaker at the International Congress of Mathematicians (ICM) in Helsinki. From 2007 to 2010 he is a vice-president of the International Mathematical Union. He was an editor of the Duke Mathematical Journal, the Journal of Algebra, Communications in Algebra, and Advances in Mathematics. Furthermore, he was on the committee of the Abel Prize and the algebra committee for the ICM 1986–1994.

Works

Articles

with Lieven Le Bruyn: 
with Corrado de Concini and George Lusztig:

Books
 2017: (with Corrado de Concini) The Invariant Theory of Matrices, American Mathematical Society
 2010: (with Corrado de Concini) Topics in Hyperplane Arrangements, Polytopes and Box-Splines, Springer 
 2006: Lie groups: An approach through invariants and representations, Springer, Universitext
 1996: (with Hanspeter Kraft) Classical Invariant Theory
 1993: (with Corrado de Concini) Quantum groups, Lecture Notes in Mathematics, Springer 
 1993: Rings with polynomial identities, Dekker 
 1983: A primer on invariant theory, Brandeis University

See also 
Hessenberg variety
Hodge algebra
Wonderful compactification

References 
The original article was a translation (Google) of the corresponding German article.

External links 
Homepage

1941 births
Living people
Sapienza University of Rome alumni
Academic staff of the Sapienza University of Rome
University of Chicago alumni
Academic staff of the University of Salento
Academic staff of the University of Pisa
20th-century Italian mathematicians
21st-century Italian mathematicians
Scientists from Rome
Algebraists